Leonardo Alberto Fernandez Napollitano (born January 13, 1974) is a retired Argentine-born Bolivian football goalkeeper. He played for 13 professional clubs in six countries.

Club career
Fernández has an extensive career in football. He started out at Argentinos Juniors, where he was promoted to the first team in 1994. He then transferred to Defensores de Belgrano. After a short spell, he moved to Bolivia in 1997 to join Oriente Petrolero, a club which acquired his playing rights shortly thereafter. Fernández spent a good portion of his career at Oriente, playing there on four occasions. During his first period with Oriente he had a series of impressive displays, a situation that encouraged him to apply for Bolivian citizenship in hopes of getting a call from the Bolivia national team. Fernández also played professionally for Independiente, Unión de Santa Fe, Chacarita Juniors and Tiro Federal in the Argentine Primera, CF Extremadura of the Spanish second division, Atlético Nacional in the Copa Mustang and Sociedad Deportiva Aucas of the Serie A de Ecuador.

In April 2007, while playing for Oriente, Fernández tested positive for marijuana consumption after a league game's doping control test. He appealed for a second test, and after the results came positive again the league decided to suspend him for a two-year period.

In 2009, Fernández returned to professional football with Bolivian first division club Real Mamoré. Later in the year, he joined La Paz F.C., club where he finished his career.

Bolivia national team
After his naturalization, Fernández was called up to represent the Bolivia national team. Between 2003 and 2005, he earned 17 caps, including 3 appearances in Copa América 2004. He represented his newly adopted country in 13 FIFA World Cup qualification matches.

Club titles

References

External links
 
 
 

1974 births
Living people
Sportspeople from Avellaneda
Association football goalkeepers
Bolivian footballers
Bolivia international footballers
Bolivian expatriate footballers
Argentine footballers
Argentine expatriate footballers
Argentinos Juniors footballers
Defensores de Belgrano footballers
Oriente Petrolero players
Club Atlético Independiente footballers
CF Extremadura footballers
Unión de Santa Fe footballers
Chacarita Juniors footballers
Atlético Nacional footballers
Tiro Federal footballers
Club Deportivo Palestino footballers
S.D. Aucas footballers
Municipal Real Mamoré players
La Paz F.C. players
Bolivian Primera División players
Chilean Primera División players
Argentine Primera División players
Categoría Primera A players
Segunda División players
Expatriate footballers in Chile
Expatriate footballers in Argentina
Expatriate footballers in Bolivia
Expatriate footballers in Colombia
Expatriate footballers in Ecuador
Expatriate footballers in Spain
Argentine expatriate sportspeople in Chile
Argentine expatriate sportspeople in Bolivia
Argentine expatriate sportspeople in Colombia
Argentine expatriate sportspeople in Ecuador
Bolivian expatriate sportspeople in Chile
Bolivian expatriate sportspeople in Argentina
Bolivian expatriate sportspeople in Colombia
Bolivian expatriate sportspeople in Ecuador
Argentine expatriate sportspeople in Spain
Argentine emigrants to Bolivia
Naturalized citizens of Bolivia